pete. was an American post-grunge and alternative metal band from New Jersey, United States. The band was most known for its song "Sweet Daze", which peaked at #17 on Billboard's Mainstream Rock Songs chart in 2001.

The band's lineup consisted of David Terrana (vocals), Rich Andruska (guitar), Lars Alverson (bass), and Scott Anderson (drums). pete. toured throughout the United States, including Detroit, Toledo, and Iowa City during the mid-1990s, which led to the band getting signed to Warner Bros. Records. pete.'s self-titled album was released on July 31, 2001.

pete. appeared on the August 29, 2001 episode of HBO's concert series Reverb with nu metal bands Adema and Staind.

In 2005, the original band members reformed as Sonicult, which released one album on Rat Pak Records in 2009. Andruska later left the band and was replaced by Freddy V.

Discography 
pete. (July 31, 2001; Warner Bros.) Produced by Ross Hogarth and Jason Slater.

Singles
Sweet Daze (2001) #14 Active rock, #17 Mainstream Rock Songs, #25 Heritage rock

References

Musical groups from New Jersey
Warner Records artists
American alternative metal musical groups
American nu metal musical groups
American post-grunge musical groups
Rock music groups from New Jersey
Alternative rock groups from New Jersey
Heavy metal musical groups from New Jersey